Cash Savage and the Last Drinks is an Australian band from Melbourne, formed in 2008 by singer and guitarist Cash Savage. Currently, the lineup also includes guitarist Joe White and Dougal Shaw, fiddlist Kat Mear, percussionist Rene Mancuso, and bassist Nick Finch. They have released four studio albums: Wolf (2010), The Hypnotiser (2013), One of Us (2016), and Good Citizens (2018).

History

2008-2014: Formation and Wolf & The Hypnotiser
Singer and songwriter Cash Savage grew up in Port Albert, in the Gippsland region of Victoria, and is the eldest of five children. Born into a musical family, Savage's uncle was Conway Savage, a veteran Australian rock musician and keyboardist for Nick Cave and the Bad Seeds. Savage began playing gigs around Melbourne at age 17. 

In 2008, Savage formed the Last Drinks as her backing band, with no fixed line-up, but instead including whoever was available to play on any given night. A self-released, self-titled EP was released in 2008. Savage credits Fitzroy venue The Old Bar as the band's spiritual home. In 2010, the band released Wolf. 

The band's line-up was solidified in 2013, and they recorded The Hypnotiser at Head Gap Studios in Preston, Victoria, produced by Nick Finch (Graveyard Train) and engineered by Nao Anzai. The album was featured in year-end critic lists by Triple R, PBS 106.7FM, and Beat Magazine. "I’m in Love" was nominated for Best Song at the Music Victoria Awards of 2013.

2015-present: One of Us & Good Citizens
In 2015, the band was signed to independent Australian label Mistletone Records to release its third studio album, One of Us (2016). The album's lyrical content reflects a tumultuous personal period for Savage. Upon its release, One of Us received very favourable critical reviews from publications such as the Sydney Morning Herald, the Herald Sun, and Beat Magazine, and was named Album of the Week by Triple R. The album's success saw the band tour Europe in 2015 and 2016, playing shows and festivals in Czech Republic, France, Poland, Netherlands and Austria. 

Following their first international tour, the band received distribution for their 2nd and 3rd albums across Europe by Beast Records.

Discography

Studio albums

Live albums

Extended plays

Awards and nominations

Music Victoria Awards
The Music Victoria Awards (previously known as The Age EG Awards and The Age Music Victoria Awards) are an annual awards night celebrating Victorian music.

|-
| Music Victoria Awards of 2013
| "I'm in Love"
| Best Song
| 
|-
| Music Victoria Awards of 2017
| themselves
| Best Live Act
| 
|-
| rowspan="2" | Music Victoria Awards of 2019
| themselves
| Best Band
| 
|-
| "Good Citizens"
| Best Song
| 
|-

National Live Music Awards
The National Live Music Awards (NLMAs) are a broad recognition of Australia's diverse live industry, celebrating the success of the Australian live scene. The awards commenced in 2016.

|-
|  2017
| Cash Savage and the Last Drinks
| Live Blues and Roots Act of the Year
| 
|-
| rowspan="2" | 2018
| Cash Savage and the Last Drinks
| Live Blues and Roots Act of the Year
| 
|-
| Kat Mear (Cash Savage and the Last Drinks)
| Live Instrumentalist Act of the Year
| 
|-
| rowspan="2"| 2019
| Cash Savage and the Last Drinks
| Live Indie / Rock Act of the Year
| 
|-
| Kat Mear (Cash Savage and the Last Drinks)
| Live Instrumentalist Act of the Year!
| 
|-

References

External links

Profile at Mistletone

Musical groups from Melbourne
Australian country music groups
Australian blues musical groups
Musical groups established in 2008